Cornelius Hogan (1878 – 14 March 1909) was a Maltese professional footballer who played as a centre forward. He played in the English Football League for New Brighton Tower and Burnley.

References

1878 births
1909 deaths
Maltese footballers
Association football forwards
Aston Villa F.C. players
Millwall F.C. players
New Brighton Tower F.C. players
Watford F.C. players
Burnley F.C. players
Fulham F.C. players
Swindon Town F.C. players
Nelson F.C. players
Rossendale United F.C. players
English Football League players
Maltese expatriate footballers
Expatriate footballers in England
Maltese expatriate sportspeople in England